Ilola (Swedish: Gladas) is a city district of the municipality of Vantaa, Finland. It is located in the northern part of the administrative district of Koivukylä. The district was primarily developed in the 1980s and 1990s, when it was one of Vantaa's fastest growing districts.

References

Vantaa
Districts of Vantaa